Elice is a comune and town in the province of Pescara, part of the Abruzzo region of Italy.

History
The territory, due to the fertility of the land, was inhabited since as early as the Paleolithic Age. The name of the village derives from holm oaks, which once covered the area. During the 15th century it belonged to the town of Penne and for a long time to the Castiglione family. It was known in the late 19th century for its ceramic workshops.

Cities and towns in Abruzzo